Le Badie is a village in Tuscany, central Italy, administratively a frazione of the comune of Castellina Marittima, province of Pisa. At the time of the 2001 census its population was 167.

Le Badie is about 45 km from Pisa and 8 km from Castellina Marittima.

References 

Frazioni of the Province of Pisa